Terry Stembridge, Sr. is a former American basketball broadcaster.

Stembridge was born in Tyler, Texas, and grew up in Kilgore, Texas, but his family moved to Yazoo City, Mississippi for his high school years.

When the American Basketball Association began play in 1967, Stembridge broadcast the Dallas Chaparrals games on radio.  Stembridge continued as the team's announcer after it became the San Antonio Spurs and when the Spurs moved into the NBA as part of the ABA-NBA merger. Stembridge broadcast 1,252 consecutive Chaparrals/Spurs games and served as their announcer for fifteen years.

In 1973 Stembridge also became part of the broadcast team for the Texas Rangers baseball team, a role he relinquished in 1974.

Stembridge later co-authored a book on the history of Kilgore, Texas.

His son, Terry Stembridge, Jr. is also a sportscaster, who was the Minnesota Vikings play by play announcer in 2001. Stembridge, Jr. was hired by Red McCombs, who Stembridge, Sr. worked for in San Antonio.

References 

Year of birth missing (living people)
Living people
People from Kilgore, Texas
People from Yazoo City, Mississippi
American Basketball Association announcers
Dallas Chaparrals announcers
Dallas Cowboys announcers
National Basketball Association broadcasters
National Football League announcers
San Antonio Spurs announcers
Texas Rangers (baseball) announcers
Major League Baseball broadcasters